Bulletin of Latin American Research is a quarterly peer-reviewed academic journal covering research on Latin American studies, including Latin America, the Caribbean, inter-American relations, and the Latin American diaspora. It is published by Wiley-Blackwell.

External links
 

Latin American studies journals
Wiley-Blackwell academic journals
Quarterly journals
English-language journals